William Heaney (born 6 June 1990 in Maryport, Cumbria) is an English former footballer who played as a midfielder. He now works as a developmental player program director at Wilmington Hammerheads.

Career
Heaney played with Scottish club Gretna 2008 from 2010 to 2012. Prior to Gretna, Heaney played for the academies of Newcastle United and Carlisle United.

Heaney signed with USL Pro club Wilmington Hammerheads on 12 April 2013 and played there until October 2013. He joined after the end of the USL Pro Season to Cumbria-based Workington and played only one game, before he returned on 3 March 2014 to Wilmington.

After three years playing for Wilmington, he was appointed as Developmental Player Program Director at the club in August 2018.

References

External links
 
 USL profile 

1990 births
Living people
English footballers
English expatriate footballers
Gretna F.C. 2008 players
Wilmington Hammerheads FC players
Expatriate soccer players in the United States
USL Championship players
Workington A.F.C. players
Association football midfielders
English expatriate sportspeople in the United States